Arlid Monsen (born 5 April 1962) is a former Norwegian cross-country skier who competed at international level from 1982 to 1985. He won the 4 × 10 km gold at the 1985 FIS Nordic World Ski Championships in Seefeld and finished seventh in the 15 km event at same championship.

Monsen's best individual career was fourth twice, reaching that mark once in 1983 and another time in 1984.

After retiring from active competition, Monsen has worked as a cross-country coach, in Canada, Sweden and Norway. Since April 2013, he has been the sprint coach for the Norwegian National Men's Cross-Country Skiing Team.

Cross-country skiing results
All results are sourced from the International Ski Federation (FIS).

World Championships
 1 medal – (1 gold)

World Cup

Season standings

Team podiums
 2 victories 
 4 podiums 

Note:   Until the 1999 World Championships, World Championship races were included in the World Cup scoring system.

References

External links

Norwegian male cross-country skiers
1962 births
Living people
FIS Nordic World Ski Championships medalists in cross-country skiing
People from Molde
Sportspeople from Møre og Romsdal